Colonel Theodore Emile Salvesen of Culrain (aka Ted Salvesen)   (1863–1942) was a 19th-century Scottish soldier and businessman.

The Theodore Salvesen Memorial Trust caring for training and financial hardship of the Merchant Navy was named in his honour.

Life

He was born on 10 March 1863 the son of Salve Christian Frederik Salvesen, a Norwegian who came to Scotland in 1851 to join his brother, Johannis Theodore Salvesen, and founded the shipping company, Turnbull and Salvesen becoming Christian Salvesen (in 1872). His mother was Amalie Georgine Salome Andorsen (1828-1901). His elder brother was Edward Theodore Salvesen (Lord Salvesen). At the time of his birth they lived at Baynefield House in Leith north of Edinburgh. The house still exists (slightly obscured) and is known simply as 122 Ferry Road.

Whilst he enjoyed the title "Colonel" his military involvement was limited to the Territorial Army and he was never involved directly in any war.

In 1899, when he took over the family firm from his father, he branched into whaling. He established the whaling colony of Leith Harbour in South Georgia, named after his home.

In 1914 he was elected a Fellow of the Royal Society of Edinburgh. His proposers were James Geikie, James Currie,  Sir Thomas Hudson Beare and William Spiers Bruce.

His company held the unfortunate claim to fame of owning the first ship sunk by a U-boat in the First World War: the SS Glitra which was destroyed in the first week of the war.

He died on 14 January 1942. He is buried with his wife in Warriston Cemetery.

Family
He was married to first Annie Forbes Burnet (1867-1909), then Marian Euphemia Smith (1869-1933).

He was father to Captain Harold Salvesen.

References

1863 births
1942 deaths
Scottish businesspeople
Scottish people of Norwegian descent
Fellows of the Royal Society of Edinburgh
People from Leith
Fellows of the Society of Antiquaries of Scotland